Dollar Down is a 1925 American silent drama film directed by Tod Browning. A print in the UCLA Film and Television Archive has one of its six reels missing. Filmed in April 1924 at the F.B.O Studios in Santa Monica, California, Dollar Down was the first of two features produced by Roland and Browning's production company, Co-Artists Productions.

Plot
As described in a film magazine reviews, Alec Craig has a fine position as general manager of a manufacturing firm, but his wife and daughter almost ruin him with their extravagance. They buy everything on the part payment plan, and their daughter Ruth pawns a ring that is not paid for to raise money with which to give an elaborate party. A man tricks her into disclosing the fact that her father’s company has an option on a valuable piece of land. Suspicion falls on Alec and he is about to lose his position. Ruth takes the blame, prevents the man from exercising the option, and a niece of Alec’s redeems the pawned ring.

Cast

References

External links

1925 films
1925 drama films
Silent American drama films
American silent feature films
American black-and-white films
Films directed by Tod Browning
1920s American films